Brando Benifei (born 1 January 1986 in La Spezia) is an Italian politician who has served as a Member of the European Parliament since 2014. He was re-elected in 2019.

Political career
During his first term from 2014 until 2019, Benifei served on the Committee on Employment and Social Affairs. In 2019, he moved to the Committee on the Internal Market and Consumer Protection. In 2020, he also joined the Special Committee on Artificial Intelligence in a Digital Age. In this capacity, he serves as the Parliament's lead rapporteur on the Artificial Intelligence Act (2021). Since 2021, he has been part of the Parliament's delegation to the Conference on the Future of Europe.

In addition to his committee assignments, Benifei is a member of the European Parliament Intergroup on Anti-Corruption, the European Parliament Intergroup on the Digital Agenda, the European Parliament Intergroup on Fighting against Poverty, the European Parliament Intergroup on Seas, Rivers, Islands and Coastal Areas, the European Parliament Intergroup on Small and Medium-Sized Enterprises (SMEs), the European Parliament Intergroup on Cancer, the MEP Alliance for Mental Health, the European Parliament Intergroup on Disability, the MEPs Against Cancer group, and of the UNITE – Parliamentary Network to End HIV/AIDS, Viral Hepatitis and Other Infectious Diseases.

Other activities
 Reimagine Europa, Member of the Advisory Board

References

Living people
1986 births
MEPs for Italy 2019–2024
Democratic Party (Italy) MEPs
Democratic Party (Italy) politicians
People from La Spezia